Hofwil Castle is a castle in the municipality of Münchenbuchsee of the Canton of Bern in Switzerland.  It is a Swiss heritage site of national significance.

History
The castle was built in 1784–86 by the architect Carl Ahasver von Sinner for Gabriel Albrecht von Erlach.  A peristyle was added to the neo-classical building in 1798.

Castle grounds
The land around the castle was laid out as an English garden with a pavilion which holds the tomb of Emanuel von Fellenberg.  The park is decorated with a number of statues including a bronze youth by Max Fueter from 1949 and the Pestalozzi monument by Alfred Lanz from 1888.  The workshops and barn were built in 1885.

See also
 List of castles in Switzerland

References

Cultural property of national significance in the canton of Bern
Castles in the Canton of Bern